Sunbury is a suburb in Melbourne, Victoria, Australia,  north-west of Melbourne's Central Business District, located within the City of Hume local government area.

Statistically, Sunbury is considered part of Greater Melbourne, as per the Victorian Government's 2009 decision to extend the urban growth boundary in 2011 to include the area, giving its land urban status and value.

History

The Sunbury area has several important Aboriginal archaeological sites, including five earth rings, which were identified in the 1970s and 1980s, and believed to have been used for ceremonial gatherings. Records of corroborees and other large gatherings during early settlement attest to the importance of the area for Aboriginal people of the Wurundjeri tribe. One Indigenous name for the area of unknown language and meaning is 'Koorakoorakup'.

Sunbury was first settled in 1836, by George Evans and William Jackson. It was Jackson and his brother, Samuel, who named the township Sunbury, after Sunbury-on-Thames, in Middlesex, England when it was established in 1857. The Post Office opened on 13 January 1858.

Sunbury's connection with the history and development of Victoria is influential because of its most famous and powerful citizen, "Big" Clarke. In 1837, Clarke came to the area, and gained vast pastoral licences encompassing Sunbury, Clarkefield and Monegeetta. His role as one of the biggest pastoralists in the colony, and his power and position within the Victorian Legislative Council, were highly significant in the early years of Victoria.

During the early decades of self-government in the Colony of Victoria there was a continual struggle in parliament, between the Legislative Assembly and the Legislative Council for ascendancy and the control of government. It was Council members, such as Clarke, who attempted to negate what they saw as the excesses of manhood suffrage, republicanism and Chartism, as embodied in the Assembly, in order to protect their own position.

"Big" Clarke, as a member of the so-called bunyip aristocracy, also helped to frustrate legislative measures involving opening land to small farm selectors. Melbourne Punch depicted Clarke in anti-squatter cartoons, such as "The Man in Possession" In 1859, "Big" Clarke was involved in a scandal around the discovery of gold on his holdings in Deep Creek. Shares in the Bolinda company soared and Clarke sold his shares at the peak of the rush, before the fraud was exposed. The gold assay was actually 'salted', possibly via a shotgun blast of golden pellets into the samples. Clarke claimed the rich assay was proved when washed in a soup bowl. The ever-barbed Melbourne Punch explained how the fraud worked in a cartoon of a chipped Chinese Willow Pattern plate titled "The Soup Plate".

In 1874, Clarke's son William built a mansion on an estate named "Rupertswood", after his own son, Rupert. The estate had access to a private railway station. Though the station was constructed in the late 19th century, the Clarkes did not pay the railways for its construction until the 1960s. (Rupertswood railway station was closed as a result of the Regional Fast Rail project and is now only a disused platform). The Clarkes also had a connection to the Kelly Gang story via their police connection with Superintendent Hare.

The younger William was the president of the Melbourne Cricket Club, and it was through that position that the touring English cricket team came to spend the Christmas of 1882 at Rupertswood. On Christmas Eve, the English team played a social game of cricket against a local team. Lady Clarke took one or more bails, burnt them, and put the ashes in a small urn, wrapped in a red velvet bag, which she presented to the English Captain, Ivo Bligh. She proposed that the ashes be used as a perpetual trophy for matches between the two countries. The Ashes has since become one of the world's most sought-after sporting trophies.

In 1922, the Clarke family sold the property to H V McKay, the owner of the Sunshine Harvester Works, who died in 1926. His estate sold the property in 1927 to the Salesian Catholic order. Until recently, the mansion and surrounding property were used for educational and agricultural purposes, and as a boarding school for students undertaking both academic and agricultural endeavours. The school, known as Salesian College, Rupertswood, is still located on the property. The mansion has been restored, and is used for weddings and other formal functions.

In the early 1970s, the area, which was then still largely rural, became famous in Australia as the site of the Sunbury Pop Festival, which was held annually from 1972 to 1975.

Culture

Sunbury's residents represent diverse cultural backgrounds, and include a major working-class sector, dependent on proximity to major manufacturing and transport hubs, such as Melbourne Airport which is only  from the township. A recent trend for people who work in the Melbourne CBD to trade longer commute times for a more economic lifestyle (due to cheaper housing), has seen the population of Sunbury grow in number, with numerous new housing estates ringing the borders of the established township.

Retail and entertainment

Sunbury has a town centre containing Boost Juice, Jaycar Electronics, Calco Electrical, Coles, Woolworths, FoodWorks and IGA supermarkets, as well as Big W, Cotton On and Target, The Good Guys, Godfrey's department stores. Away from the town centre is an Aldi Supermarket, and Bunnings Warehouse hardware store. There are also many food outlets located in Sunbury such as Nando's, Vics Cuisine, Rocquette, Restaurant 77, Schnitz, and a variety of pizza restaurants, fish and chip shops and Asian restaurants. Sunbury also has many cafes to dine at such as The Spotted Owl, Sacco Coffee, café Circe and Mac's Lounge. Sunbury has a Reading Cinema, three Hotels and The Alley, a 330-person capacity nightclub.

Transport

Bus
Nine bus routes service Sunbury:

 : Westfield Airport West – Sunbury station via Melbourne Airport. Operated by CDC Melbourne.
 : Sunbury station – Mount Lion. Operated by Sunbury Bus Service.
 : Sunbury station – Moonee Ponds Junction via Diggers Rest. Operated by Sunbury Bus Service.
 : Sunbury station – Wilsons Lane. Operated by Sunbury Bus Service.
 : Sunbury station – Rolling Meadows. Operated by Sunbury Bus Service.
 : Sunbury station – Killara Heights. Operated by Sunbury Bus Service.
 : Sunbury station – Jacksons Hill. Operated by Sunbury Bus Service.
 : Sunbury station – Canterbury Hills. Operated by Sunbury Bus Service.
 Lancefield – Sunbury – Clarkefield via Romsey and Monegeetta. Operated by Dysons.

Train
Sunbury station is connected by Metro services to Melbourne on the Sunbury Line and by V/Line services on the Bendigo line to both Melbourne and country Victoria. V/Line services are not as frequent as those on the metropolitan Metro service – an approximate hourly frequency is provided by V/Line on weekdays, although on weekends service levels can be as infrequent as once every 80 minutes.

The State Government electrified the tracks between Sunbury and Sydenham in a $270 million investment, bringing more frequent passenger services to the town – these Metro services started operating on 18 November 2012.

Education

Primary schools
 Sunbury West Primary School
 Sunbury Primary School
 Sunbury Heights Primary School
 Killara Primary School
 Kismet Park Primary School
 St Anne's Primary School
 Our Lady of Mount Carmel Primary School
 Goonawarra Primary School

Secondary schools and high schools
 Sunbury Downs College (formerly Sunbury Post-primary School)
 Sunbury College (formerly Sunbury Secondary College, Sunbury High School)
 Salesian College

Others
 Sunbury and Macedon Ranges Special School

Sport
Sunbury is represented in the following sporting leagues:

 Athletics
 Sunbury Little Athletics Centre Inc
 Australian rules football
 Sunbury Football Club (Ballarat Football League)
 Sunbury Kangaroos Junior Football Club (Riddell District Football League) – club official website
 Rupertswood Football Club (Victorian Amateur Football Association) – club official website
 East Sunbury Sporting Group – Seniors and juniors Football Club (Essendon District Football League) – club official website
 Bandy
 Australian Bandy League is based here.
 Badminton
 Sunbury Badminton Club Inc
 Baseball
 Sunbury Titans Baseball club
 Basketball
 Sunbury Basketball Association
 Big V Basketball
 Bicycle
 Sunbury Bicycle User Group
 Cricket
 Sunbury Cricket Club, Clarke Oval
 Gisborne and District Cricket Association
 East Sunbury Cricket Club
 Sunbury Kangaroos Cricket Club
 Sunbury United Cricket Club
 Rupertswood Cricket Club
 Dancing
 Roselind Calisthenics
 Classique School of Dance
 Flash Dance
 Sunbury school of Calisthenics
 Hotpink Dance Centre
 Shirley Rogers Academy of Dance
 Concept Performing Arts
 Girl Guides
 Sunbury Leadbeater Guides (Age 5–7 years)
 Sunbury Sugarglider Guides (Age 5–7 years)
 Sunbury Wongguri Guides (Age 7–11 years)
 Sunbury Kamballa Guides (Age 11–14 years)
 Sunbury Bluebell Guides (Age 14–17 years)
 Golf
 Golfers play at the course of the Goonawarra Golf Club at Francis Boulevard, Sunbury.
 Sunbury Golf Range located just off Sunbury Road on the way to Melbourne Airport.
 Horse riding
 Sunbury Pony Club
 Sunbury Riding Centre
 Lawn Bowls
 Royal Victorian Bowls Association – Metro
 Sunbury Bowling Club
Victorian Ladies' Bowls Association
 Rugby league
 Sunbury Tigers (Victorian Rugby League) – club official website
 Junior Side (Melbourne Junior Rugby League)
 Soccer
 Sunbury United (Victorian State League 2)
 Sunbury United Junior Football Club
 Softball 
 Sunbury Softball Association
 Swimming
 Sunbury Amateur Swimming Club
 Aqua Wolves Swimming Club
 Table Tennis
 The Sunbury & District Table Tennis Association – club official website
 Tennis
 Sunbury Lawn Tennis Club
 Mt. Carmel Tennis Club

Politics

Sunbury is represented by Cr Trevor Dance, Cr Jarrod Bell and Cr Steve (Jack) Medcraft in the Jacksons Creek Ward of the City of Hume. At State level, Sunbury is in the Electoral district of Sunbury, represented by Josh Bull. Federally, Sunbury is located in the Division of McEwen, represented by Rob Mitchell.

Notable people
 Mark Blicavs – Australian rules footballer
 Sara Blicavs – WNBL player and Australian Opals player
 Matthew Egan – Australian rules footballer
 Cameron Guthrie – Australian rules footballer
 Zach Guthrie – Australian rules footballer
 Mark Johnson – Australian rules footballer
 James Kelly – Australian rules footballer
 Jamie Maclaren – Australian Soccer player, striker for Melbourne City FC, Hibernian F.C. and Australia
 Shirley McKerrow – Politician, first woman elected Federal President of any Australian political party
 Nathan Phillips – Actor
 David Schwarz – Australian rules footballer
 Cassi Van Den Dungen – Model, runner-up in 2009 on Australia's Next Top Model
 Cameron Wight – Australian rules footballer
 Linden Hall – Athlete

See also

 Shire of Bulla – Sunbury was previously within this former local government area.
 Rupertswood
 Salesian College
 Sunbury Bus Service
 Sunbury Downs College
 Sunbury Industrial School
 Sunbury Lunatic Asylum
 Sunbury-on-Thames
 Sunbury Pop Festival
 Sunbury railway station

Historical bibliography 
 O'Brien, Antony. Shenanigans on the Ovens Goldfields: the 1859 election, Artillery Publishing, Hartwell, 2005. (details on the Bolinda Company gold scam and 'Big'Clarke's role in Upper House)
 Serle, Geoffrey. The Golden Age: A History of the Colony of Victoria, 1851-1861, Melbourne University Press, Carlton, 1963. (gold, squatters and government)
 Spreadbrough Robert and Anderson, Hugh. Victorian Squatters, Red Rooster, Ascot Vale, 1983. (detailed maps of squatters runs in the district)
 Turner, Henry Giles, A History of the Colony of Victoria: from its discovery to its absorption in the Commonwealth of Australia, Vols 1 & 2, Melbourne, 1904.

References

External links 
 Sunbury 3429
 The Carroll Directory
 Sunbury Online
 Hume City Council
 Sunbury Community Festival
 Sunbury Radio 3NRG
 Sunbury Family History Society
 Sunbury Swimming Club

 
Suburbs of Melbourne
Suburbs of the City of Hume